Mikey Freedom Hart is a Grammy Award-winning American singer-songwriter, multi-instrumentalist, and record producer. He has worked with Bleachers, Taylor Swift, Empress Of, Dev Hynes a.k.a. Blood Orange, ASAP Rocky, Lana Del Rey, Tei Shi, and The Chicks. He has received two Grammy nominations, of which he received one win.

A classically trained pianist, Hart has performed and recorded with various musical instruments. He now currently plays live for Bleachers and Blood Orange.

Life and career
Hart was born and raised in Lake Charles, Louisiana where he attended Barbe High School followed by McNeese State University. He then moved to New York City at the age of 16 where he started learning piano classically at age three, grew up performing and singing in church.

In 2018, Hart co-wrote the Dev Hynes song "Hope" featuring Puff Daddy and Tei Shi in the Negro Swan album.

He has played and added additional production to Santigold's single "Banshee".

He co-produced and co-wrote the Portugal. The Man's song "Easy Tiger".

In 2020, he played and recorded DX7, electric guitar, nylon guitar, Rhodes, and celesta on Taylor Swift's song "Gold Rush". He can be heard playing a number of instruments and adding his sound to Swift's albums Lover, Folklore, Evermore, Fearless (Taylor's Version), and Red (Taylor's Version).

He played piano on Lana Del Rey's albums Norman Fucking Rockwell! and Chemtrails over the Country Club.

Hart has also worked with several other artists including Empress Of, ASAP Rocky, The Chicks, and Emily Lind.

He was a producer on the Jon Batiste's single "Freedom" and album We Are for which he was nominated for Grammy Awards in 2021.

Bands
Hart is currently playing keys for the Bleachers and they are currently performing for the NPR's Tiny Desk Concerts. He is also playing keyboard and piano for Blood Orange, and they are also performing for the NPR's Tiny Desk Concerts.

He performed and helped direct the musical component of Louis Vuitton Fall 2019 Menswear Fashion show at Paris Fashion Week.

Ex Reyes
In 2015, Hart started a solo project as Brooklyn-based psychedelic-soul band "Ex Reyes". Different musicians are performing for the band.

In 2016, music video for the song "Keeping U in Line" was released. In 2017, an original song "Blame Me" was released with Amazon Music.

Accolades
Hart was nominated for two Grammy Awards at the 64th Annual Grammy Awards for producing and playing on Jon Batiste's album We Are and for engineering on Taylor Swift's album Evermore. He won for the former.

|-
! scope="row" | 2022
| We Are (producer)
| Grammy Award for Album of the Year
| 
|-
! scope="row" | 2022
| Evermore (musician)
| Grammy Award for Album of the Year
|

References

Singer-songwriters from Louisiana
Living people
Year of birth missing (living people)
People from New Orleans
Jazz musicians from New Orleans
American jazz singers
American jazz songwriters
21st-century American singers